The following is a list of results for the Italy national rugby league team since their first match in 1950. Matches marked with a † are not included in the results table as they were not sanctioned by the Rugby League International Federation. The matches were either not played by two RLIF-recognised national teams, or were played with modified rules (often an extended bench and unlimited interchanges).

All time record

Matches

Italian Federation of Amateur Rugby 13

Italia Rugby League

Federazione Italia Rugby League

External links 

 Italy results at Rugby League Project
 Italy results at Rugby League European Federation

Italy national rugby league team
Rugby league-related lists